Tamba Borbor-Sawyer is a Sierra Leonean politician and a retired officer in the Sierra Leone Police. He was a member of the third parliament from the opposition Sierra Leone People's Party (SLPP) representing Kailahun District, but was suspended from the party in 2010 after taking up a cabinet position in the government led by the All People's Congress.

Borbor-Sawyer is a member of the Kissi ethnic group.

References

Living people
Members of the Parliament of Sierra Leone
Sierra Leonean police officers
Sierra Leone People's Party politicians
Year of birth missing (living people)
Place of birth missing (living people)